The Salmonberry Trail is a planned rail trail hiking and biking trail through the Oregon Coast Range along the Salmonberry River in northwest Oregon, United States. A portion of the Port of Tillamook Bay Railroad was washed out by a storm in 2007. In 2012, advocacy efforts to build a trail were launched, and in 2018, the Salmonberry Trail Intergovernmental Agency was established to oversee the development of the trail.

The Salmonberry Trail has four sections with a total of 84 miles. The coastal section is 26 miles long and runs from the city of Wheeler to the city of Tillamook. This section goes through the cities of Rockaway Beach, Garibaldi, and Bay City. This portion of the trail will also connect with the Tillamook Cheese Factory. Another section is about 17 miles from Salmonberry River and Nehalem River to Wheeler. One section is 16 miles that is along the Nehalem River. This section is most primitive of the four sections. The last section of the trail, 25 miles, is closest to the city of Portland. Starting in Banks and ending at the Cochran Trailhead, in the Tillamook State Forest.

See also 
 List of Oregon state forests
 Long-distance trails in the United States
 Oregon Coast Trail

References

External links 
 Official web site
 Map of the route

Rail trails in Oregon
Transportation in Tillamook County, Oregon
Transportation in Washington County, Oregon